Friedrichshafen Stadt (city) station is the largest railway station of the city of Friedrichshafen on Lake Constance (Bodensee) and a railway junction in the German state of Baden-Württemberg. It has five tracks and is classified by Deutsche Bahn as a category 3 station. Each day it is used by about 160 trains operated by Deutsche Bahn and the Bodensee-Oberschwaben-Bahn (BOB). Ulm–Friedrichshafen railway from Ulm ends at the station, where it meets the Stahringen–Friedrichshafen railway and the Friedrichshafen–Lindau railway. Another major railway station in the city, Friedrichshafen Hafen station (Friedrichshafen port station), which is operated as part of Friedrichshafen Stadt station, was used until 1976 for loading and unloading carriages on the Lake Constance train ferry to Romanshorn in Switzerland.

Location

Friedrichshafen Stadt station is located in the northwest of the city of Friedrichshafen. The station building is south of the tracks and its address is Stadtbahnhof 1. South of the station building, Bahnhofplatz (station place) extends from the bus station to Friedrichstraße, which links the station to the city centre. On the south side of Friedrichstrasse is the town park, which runs along the banks of Lake Constance, which is about 200 metres from the station. North of the station are Eugenstraße and Franziskusplatz. Local highway K7739 (here called Riedleparkstraße), runs through a tunnel under the tracks to the east of the station. Olgastraße crosses the tracks over a level crossing to the west of the station.

History

Friedrichshafen Stadt station was dedicated on 8 November 1847 as the first station on Lake Constance with the opening of the first section of the Württemberg Southern Railway from Ravensburg to Friedrichshafen. This meant that the Kingdom of Württemberg had achieved its goal of completing the first railway to Lake Constance ahead of Bavaria and Baden. The station building was built between 1846 and 1848 by the architect Ludwig Friedrich von Gaab. On 26 May 1849, the Southern Railway was extended to Biberach an der Riss and on 1 June 1850 to Ulm. With the completion of Fils Valley Railway from Ulm to Stuttgart on 29 June 1850, Friedrichshafen and the Southern Railway were connected to the rest of the Württemberg railway network, allowing a continuous service from Heilbronn to Friedrichshafen. On 1 October 1899, the first piece of the Bodenseegürtel Railway (Lake Constance Belt Railway) was opened from Lindau to Friedrichshafen Stadt and opened and on 2 October 1901 the line was continued from Friedrichshafen to Überlingen, which had been connected since 1895 to Singen via Radolfzell. Two wings were added to the station building for the Bodenseegürtel Railway, which connected Bavaria, Württemberg and Baden. The Southern Railway was duplicated from 1905 to 1913. On 2 June 1922, the Württembergische Nebenbahnen AG (Württemberg Secondary Railways Company) commenced operations on the Teuringen Valley Railway (Teuringertal-Bahn) to Oberteuringen. Already in May 1923 it had to close its operations for financial reasons, before they could be restarted in 1924 by the Teuringertal-Bahn GmbH. In the Second World War the west wing was destroyed in an air raid on 20 July 1944; it was rebuilt after the war in its original form. Passenger services on the Teuringen Valley Railway were closed on 23 May 1954 and freight traffic ended on 15 February 1960. The section from Friedrichshafen Stadt to the former Friedrichshafen-Zahnradfabrik station continues to operate as a siding.

The lines from Ulm and Lindau have been electrified since December 2021.

Rail operations

Friedrichshafen Stadt station has five platform tracks adjacent to three platforms. All platforms are covered and have digital destination displays. The central platforms are connected by an underpass to the platform next to the station building (platform 1) and Franziskusplatz. Except for a lift on platform 1 no lifts or ramps, so the station is not accessible for the disabled.  The station is classified by Deutsche Bahn as a category 3 station.

Until 28 November 2004, signals and switches at the station were controlled by three electro-mechanical signal boxes of a class introduced by Siemens & Halske in 1912, which became operational in 1930, 1947 and 1953. Since 28 November 2004, the station has been controlled by an electronic interlocking built by Lorenz.

Platform information

Rail services

The following services have operated since the start of the December 2021 timetable, which coincided with the electrification of the lines from Ulm and Lindau:

Other stations in Friedrichshafen

In addition to the Stadt and the  Hafen stations,  Friedrichshafen has the stations of Löwental and Flughafen Friedrichshafen on the Southern Railway, and the stations of Friedrichshafen Kluftern, Friedrichshafen-Fischbach, Friedrichshafen Landratsamt, Friedrichshafen Ost and Friedrichshafen Manzell station on the Bodenseegürtel Railway. There were also the stations of Seemoos and Friedrichshafen Strandbad, which were also on the Bodenseegürtel Railway and are now closed. On the now disused Teuringen Valley Railway there was the stations of Friedrichshafen-Zahnradfabrik, Friedrichshafen-Trautenmühle, Friedrichshafen-Meistershofen, Kappelhof  and Berg (b Friedrichshafen). Friedrichshafen's freight yard (Friedrichshafen Gbf) lies just south the junction of the Southern Railway to Ulm and the Bodenseegürtel Railway towards Lindau.

Notes

External links 
 

Stadt
Stadt
Railway stations in Germany opened in 1847
Buildings and structures in Bodenseekreis